Heteroconis is a genus of lacewings belonging to the family Coniopterygidae.

The species of this genus are found in Southeastern Asia, Australia and New Zealand.

Species

Species:

Heteroconis acuticauda 
Heteroconis aethiopica 
Heteroconis africana 
Heteroconis ornata

References

Coniopterygidae
Neuroptera genera